Thomas Carter was an Anglican priest in Ireland during the 19th-century.

Carter was  born in Dublin and educated at Trinity College there. He was appointed Prebendary of Tandragee in Armagh Cathedral in 1803; and the Dean of Tuam in 1813. He died of cholera on 19 August 1849, and was buried at his prebendal church.

References

Notes

Alumni of Trinity College Dublin
Deans of Tuam
Church of Ireland priests
19th-century Irish Anglican priests
Christian clergy from Dublin (city)
1867 deaths